FC Hiré is an Ivorian football club. In 2010, they were relegated from the highest level of football in the country. The team represents the town of Hiré.

Football clubs in Ivory Coast
Sport in Gôh-Djiboua District
Lôh-Djiboua